Nick Jensen (born September 21, 1990) is an American professional ice hockey defenseman for the Washington Capitals of the National Hockey League (NHL). Jensen was drafted 150th overall by the Detroit Red Wings in the 2009 NHL Entry Draft.

Early life
Jensen was born on September 21, 1990, in Saint Paul, Minnesota. His father Jeff played college hockey at Lake Superior State and was a Colorado Rockies draft pick. His uncle Steve also played hockey and was a member of the Minnesota North Stars and Los Angeles Kings.

Playing career

Amateur
Jensen played college hockey with the St. Cloud State Huskies in the NCAA Men's Division I WCHA conference. In his freshman season at St. Cloud State, Jensen recorded five goals and 18 assists in 38 games.

In his sophomore season, Jensen was the third-leading scorer for St. Cloud State. Jensen recorded six goals and 26 assists in 39 games. St. Cloud State finished sixth in the competitive WCHA. After sweeping Nebraska-Omaha in the first round of the playoffs, the Huskies suffered a season-ending loss to North Dakota in the quarterfinal.

In his junior season, Jensen skated in 42 games for St. Cloud State, and was named the WCHA's Defensive Player of the Year and selected to the NCAA West First All-American Team. Jensen recorded four goals and was second on the Huskies with 27 assists. St. Cloud State finished tied with Minnesota for first in the WCHA and rebounded from a loss to Wisconsin in the WCHA semifinals to reach the Frozen Four. St. Cloud State defeated Notre Dame, 5–1, and Miami, 4–1, to capture the NCAA Midwest Regional before falling to Quinnipiac, 4–1, in the Frozen Four semifinals.

Professional

Detroit Red Wings
On May 2, 2013, the Detroit Red Wings signed Jensen to a two-year entry-level contract.

During the 2014–15 season, Jensen recorded six goals and 21 assists in 75 games for the Grand Rapids Griffins, and ranked second among Griffins defenseman in scoring. Jensen finished the season with a plus-30 rating, which was tied for the best plus-minus rating in the AHL. On July 13, 2015, the Detroit Red Wings signed Jensen to a two-year contract extension.

During the 2015–16 season, on January 24, 2016, Jensen was recalled by the Detroit Red Wings. Prior to being recalled, Jensen recorded two goals and six assists in 39 games for the Grand Rapids Griffins. He was reassigned to the Griffins on January 26 without featuring in a game.

On December 19, 2016, Jensen was recalled by the Detroit Red Wings. Prior to being recalled, Jensen recorded one goal and five assists in 27 games for the Grand Rapids Griffins. He made his NHL debut for the Red Wings the following day in a game against the Tampa Bay Lightning.  On February 27, 2017, the Red Wings signed Jensen to a two-year contract extension.

During the 2018–19 season, his third season with the Red Wings, Jensen recorded two goals and 13 assists, tying his previous season high totals through 60 games with 15 points.

Washington Capitals
While in the final year of his contract, Jensen was traded by the Red Wings, along with a fifth-round pick in the 2019 NHL Entry Draft, to the Washington Capitals in exchange for Madison Bowey, and a second-round pick in the 2020 NHL Entry Draft. He was then re-signed to a four-year, $10 million contract extension by the Capitals.

During his 109th game with the Capitals, Jensen scored his first goal in a Capitals uniform on March 7, 2021 against the Philadelphia Flyers. At the time of the goal, Jensen had recorded 14 points over 41 games. Prior to the 2021 NHL Expansion Draft, Jensen was left unprotected by the Capitals for Seattle.

During the 2022-23 NHL season, rumors of a potential trade involving Jensen surfaced. However, a few days before the trade deadline on February 28, 2023, Jensen signed a three year, $12.15 million contract extension, which carries a $4.05 million annual cap hit.

International play

On April 28, 2018, Jensen and fellow Red Wings teammate Dylan Larkin were named to the United States men's national ice hockey team to compete at the 2018 IIHF World Championship. He recorded one goal and three assists in 10 games and won a bronze medal.

Personal life
Jensen and his wife Jenner both played sports at Rogers High School. She was an All-American basketball player who scored 1,634 points during her career. Jensen and his wife had their first child together on March 17, 2020.

Career statistics

Regular season and playoffs

International

Awards and honors

References

External links 
 

1990 births
Living people
American men's ice hockey defensemen
Detroit Red Wings draft picks
Detroit Red Wings players
Grand Rapids Griffins players
Green Bay Gamblers players
Ice hockey people from Saint Paul, Minnesota
People from Hennepin County, Minnesota
St. Cloud State Huskies men's ice hockey players
Toledo Walleye players
Washington Capitals players
AHCA Division I men's ice hockey All-Americans